Michael Nushöhr (born 14 August 1962) is a German retired footballer who played as a defender. He appeared at the 1981 FIFA World Youth Championship.

References

External links
 

1962 births
Living people
German footballers
Association football defenders
Germany youth international footballers
Bundesliga players
2. Bundesliga players
SSV Ulm 1846 players
1. FC Saarbrücken players
VfB Stuttgart players
1. FC Kaiserslautern players
FC Balzers players
German football managers
FC Balzers managers
German expatriate footballers
German expatriate sportspeople in Switzerland
Expatriate footballers in Switzerland
Expatriate football managers in Switzerland
Sportspeople from Ulm
Footballers from Baden-Württemberg